Marsu Productions,  or simply Marsu, is a publishing house and licensing and merchandising company located in Monaco, managing Franco-Belgian comics characters and copyright concerns, chiefly from the comics universe of André Franquin. The name Marsu refers to one of Franquin's best known characters, the Marsupilami, but  the company also handles the character universes of Gaston Lagaffe, Le Petit Noël, Les Monstres, as well as François Walthéry's Natacha and Le P'tit bout d'chique, and Léonid et Spoutnika by Yann and Philippe Bercovici among others.

Franquin, who had previously worked for the publishing house Dupuis, decided to leave his company and start his own in 1987. He brought along his own creations Marsupilami and Gaston Lagaffe, and the company soon started 
launching a series of Marsupilami albums continuing publication of the character Franquin had created in 1952, while working on the series Spirou et Fantasio for the Franco-Belgian comics magazine Spirou. Since Spirou and Fantasio weren't Franquin's own creations, the publisher Dupuis retained the rights to the characters. Several of the characters under Marsu management are however closely associated with this series, and Marsupilami, Gaston Lagaffe, and Le Petit Noël are to varying degrees spin-off series.

The first publication, La Queue du Marsupilami in 1987 with art by Batem and stories by Greg, launched its new series, which by 2007 had passed 20 issues. Natacha made the switch from Dupuis to Marsu in 1989 with the album Cauchemirage, and ended serial production in Spirou. In 1992, Franquin also added worldwide rights of Gaston Lagaffe to Marsu, a series he also created for Spirou. The Marsupilami album numbered 0, Capturez un Marsupilami, the only album featuring Franquin's seminal stories, was published in 2002, some time after Franquin's death in 1997.

In 2013, the publisher was bought up by its competitor Dupuis.

References

External links
Marsu Productions official page 
Franquin official page 

Comic book publishing companies of Monaco